The Little French Girl is a 1925 American silent drama film directed by Herbert Brenon and written by John Russell and Anne Douglas Sedgwick from a 1924 novel by Sedgwick. The film stars Mary Brian, Maurice de Canonge, Paul Doucet, Maude Turner Gordon, Neil Hamilton, Julia Hurley, and Jane Jennings. The film was released on May 31, 1925, by Paramount Pictures.

Plot
As described in a film magazine review, Madame Vervier, a sophisticated woman, sends her daughter Alix to live with Owen Bradley's parents in London. Madame is ashamed of the life she has led in Paris. Owen is in the midst of a flirtation with her despite his family's feelings and his having a fiancée. After Owen's death, Alix learns of the reputation her mother has, and tries to keep Toppie, Owen's fiancée, from joining a convent. Toppie is told of the affair between Owen and Madame, but she still wants to go to a convent. Giles, a friend of Toppie, goes from London to Paris seeking Alix, the "little French girl."

Cast

Preservation
With no prints of The Little French Girl located in any film archives, it is a lost film.

See also
The Little Irish Girl (1926) starring Dolores Costello

References

External links

Stills at Alice Joyce website, stanford.edu
 

1925 drama films
1925 films
American black-and-white films
Silent American drama films
American silent feature films
1920s English-language films
Films directed by Herbert Brenon
Films based on British novels
Lost American films
Paramount Pictures films
1925 lost films
Lost drama films
1920s American films
Films with screenplays by John Russell (screenwriter)
Films set in London
Films set in Paris